Widforss is a surname of Swedish origin. Notable people with the surname include:

Gunnar Widforss (1879–1934), Swedish-American artist who specialized in painting subjects from the wilderness 
Nils Widforss (1880–1960), Swedish gymnast who competed in the 1908 Summer Olympics

Other
Widforss Trail,  hiking trail located on the North Rim of the Grand Canyon National Park

Swedish-language surnames